The Oceania Swimming Association is the continental governing body recognised by FINA, for the national governing bodies of swimming, open water swimming, diving, water polo, synchronised swimming and masters swimming in Oceania.

The body was established in January 1991 during the 1991 World Aquatics Championships in Perth, Australia. At the OSA Congress held in June 2008, Dennis Miller of Fiji was elected President of the organization. The body will next meet during the 2009 World Championships in Rome, Italy.

The OSA also tracks and maintains the Oceania Records.

Member Federations
There are currently 14 member federations of the Oceania Swimming Association (listed here with their FINA abbreviation following their country name):

  (ASA) – American Samoa Swimming Association
  (AUS) – Swimming Australia
  (COK) – Cook Islands Aquatics Federation
  (FIJ) – Fiji Swimming
  (FSM) – Federated States of Micronesia Swimming Association
  (GUM) – Guam Swimming Federation
  (MIL) – Marshall Islands Swimming Federation
  (NMA) – Northern Mariana Islands Swimming Federation
  (NZL) – Swimming New Zealand
  (PLW) – Palau Swimming Association
  (PNG) – Papua New Guinea Swimming
  (SAM) – Samoa Swimming Federation
  (SOL) – Solomon Islands Swimming Federation
  (TAH) – Federation Tahitienne de Natation

In July 2009, an OSA President report cited the Vanuatu's non-member status is due to its new member status with FINA (i.e. the OSA may not have met yet since Vanuatu became a FINA member). As Tonga became a member in January 2010, it is presumed too recently approved for inclusion.

Competitions
The main competitions that the Oceania Swimming Association runs:
 Oceania Swimming Championships (biannual, last held in 2018), which includes Open Water Swimming and Synchronized Swimming
 Oceania Masters Championships

References

External links
 Official website

 
Swimming organizations
 
Swim
Swimming in Oceania
Sports organizations established in 1991
1991 establishments in Oceania